KLRD (90.1 FM) is an FM radio station broadcasting out of San Bernardino, California and airing the Christian Worship formatted Air 1 network.

KLRD also broadcasts its programming over the following translators: W202CF (88.3 FM) Champaign, Illinois, K208DV (89.5 FM) Saint Cloud, Minnesota, K216DR (91.1 FM Central Point, Oregon, K224DK (92.7 FM) Fontana, California and K300CW (107.9 FM) Indio, California.

External links
 KLRD official website

LRD
Air1 radio stations
Radio stations established in 1988
1988 establishments in California
Educational Media Foundation radio stations